Alarico Gattia (9 December 1927 – 3 September 2022) was an Italian comic artist and illustrator.

Life and career
Born in Genoa, Gattia started his career in Milan as an illustrator for advertising and for several Mondadori publications, notably Epoca. He made his debut as a comic artist in the late 1960s, collaborating with comics magazines such as Corriere dei Piccoli, Il Giornalino, and Comic Art, and illustrating some Diabolik and Tex Willer stories.

References

External links
 Alarico Gattia at Lambiek

1927 births
2022 deaths
Artists from Genoa
Italian comics artists
Italian illustrators